Repalle mandal is one of the 25 mandals in Bapatla district of the state of Andhra Pradesh, India. It is under the administration of Bapatla revenue division and the mandal headquarters are located at Repalle. The mandal is situated on the banks of Krishna River of Velanadu region and is bounded by Bhattiprolu, Nagaram and Nizampatnam mandals.

History 

On 1 October 1904, Guntur district was formed with eight mandals. In 1909, Repalle mandal was formed by carving out from Tenali mandal. In 1933, eleven of its villages were merged in Bapatla mandal and in 1981-82, Repalle mandal was further divided into Repalle and Pallpatla.

Demographics 

 census, the mandal had a population of 111,989. The total population constitute, 54,956 males and 57,936 females —a sex ratio of 1056 females per 1000 males. 9,461 children are in the age group of 0–6 years, of which 4,824 are boys and 4,637 are girls. The average literacy rate stands at 72.99% with 74,830 literates.

Politics

Administration 

The mandal is under the control of a tahsildar. The present tahsildar of the mandal is M.Nagi Reddy.  census, the mandal has 18 revenue villages and 28 gram panchayats. Repalle is the only town in the mandal.

The settlements in the mandal are listed below:

Note: M-Municipality

Politics 

The mandal is one of the 4 mandals under Repalle (Assembly constituency), which in turn represents Bapatla (SC) (Lok Sabha constituency) of Andhra Pradesh.

Education 

The mandal plays a major role in education for the rural students of the nearby villages. The primary and secondary school education is imparted by government, aided and private schools, under the School Education Department of the state. As per the school information report for the academic year 2015–16, the mandal has more than 13,889 students enrolled in over 128 schools.

See also 
 List of mandals in Andhra Pradesh
 Villages in Repalle mandal. In kaithepalli village is   panchayethe under the villages are  Ramudu pallem

References

Mandals in Guntur district